Oslo West Station or Oslo V, is a former railway station located in Vika in Oslo, Norway. It was the terminus of the Drammen Line between 1872 and 1980, until the Oslo Tunnel opened. The station remained in use until 1989, when all traffic was moved to the new Oslo Central Station. Until its closure it was the main station for trains on the Sørland Line, the Drammen Line and the Vestfold Line. There was no passenger rail connection to Oslo Ø, the eastern station that served the eastern lines and trains to Bergen. The only connection was the Oslo Port Line that went partially through some of the most trafficked streets in Oslo.

The station building was designed by architect Georg Andreas Bull in the then-fashionable Italiante style and built of plastered brickwork. The facade against City Hall Square is flanked by two low towers. Windows and doors are arched. After the station closed, the building was used by, among others, the Nobel Peace Center.

On 13 April 1921, the restaurant was taken over by Norsk Spisevognselskap, after it had received a renovation, which was completed on 1 May. In 1922, the company and Narvesen opened two kiosks at the station. After the station was partially destroyed on 2 February 1942, it remained closed until 1 June.

References

External links

 Entry at the Norwegian Railway Club

Railway stations in Oslo
Railway stations on the Drammen Line
1872 establishments in Norway
1989 disestablishments in Norway
Railway stations opened in 1872
Railway stations closed in 1989
Disused railway stations in Norway